The Barberini Hera or Barberini Juno is a Roman sculpture of Hera or Juno, copied from a Greek original. Excavated in Rome in the late 17th century, it is preserved in the Museo Pio-Clementino.

Description
The statue depicts the goddess standing, wearing a crown and peplos (which clings to show her form beneath and has dropped from her left shoulder, nearly revealing her breast) and now resting the weight of her restored right arm on a standing sceptre and carrying a patera in her left. This sculpture is a Roman copy of a Greek original, possibly by Alcamenes; Lewis Richard Farnell suggested only that "the not infrequent repetition of the type suggests a Greek original of some celebrity." It is now in the Museo Pio-Clementino in the Vatican Museums. It is also sometimes identified as a Ceres. The right arm and the nose are restorations

Discovery
It was excavated by the antiquary Leonardo Agostini in the late 17th century on the Viminal Hill, under the convent associated with the church of San Lorenzo in Panisperna, the site of the ancient Baths of Olimpiades, and was given its conventional identification by its early owner, Cardinal Francesco Barberini.

Notes

17th-century archaeological discoveries
Hera
Sculptures of Hera
Sculptures of the Vatican Museums
Roman copies of Greek sculptures